Matan Ohayon is a retired Israeli footballer who has played for Hapoel Ra'anana.

Honours

Club
 Hapoel Ironi Kiryat Shmona
 Israel State Cup (1): 2013–14

 Hapoel Be'er Sheva
 Israeli Premier League (3): 2015–16, 2016-17, 2017-18
Israel Super Cup (2): 2016, 2017
Toto Cup (1): 2016–17

References

External links 

1986 births
Living people
Israeli Sephardi Jews
Israeli Mizrahi Jews
Israeli footballers
F.C. Ashdod players
Sektzia Ness Ziona F.C. players
Hapoel Rishon LeZion F.C. players
R. Charleroi S.C. players
Maccabi Petah Tikva F.C. players
Hapoel Ironi Kiryat Shmona F.C. players
Maccabi Haifa F.C. players
Hapoel Tel Aviv F.C. players
Hapoel Be'er Sheva F.C. players
Hapoel Ra'anana A.F.C. players
Liga Leumit players
Israeli Premier League players
Belgian Pro League players
Israeli expatriate footballers
Expatriate footballers in Belgium
Israeli expatriate sportspeople in Belgium
Israeli people of Egyptian-Jewish descent
Israeli people of Moroccan-Jewish descent
Challenger Pro League players
Footballers from Ashdod
Association football fullbacks